Just Visiting is a 2001 action comedy film that is an American remake of the French film Les Visiteurs. It stars Jean Reno, Christina Applegate, Christian Clavier, Malcolm McDowell, Tara Reid, and Bridgette Wilson. It follows a medieval knight and his serf who travel to 21st-century Chicago, meeting the knight's descendant.

Unlike the original film, the remake was not successful in either France or the United States.

This was Hollywood Pictures' final production before it folded into the management of its sister company, Touchstone Pictures, until Hollywood Pictures released the 2006 horror movie Stay Alive and is one of the last films to be distributed by it.

Plot
The film takes place in 12th-century England, where Count Thibault Malefète is about to marry Princess Rosalind, the daughter of the reigning King.

At the wedding banquet, an enemy known as the Earl of Warwick accidentally gives Thibault a potion which makes him hallucinate (and which was actually intended for Rosalind by a witch hired by the Earl), and under its influence, he kills his own bride believing she is a ferocious monster. While under sentence of death, he asks his servant, André Le Paté to find a wizard to help him. The wizard gives him a potion that will send him back to the moment before he killed Princess Rosalind. The wizard botches the spell, and instead, Thibault and Andre are sent into the 21st century.

They end up in a museum in Chicago where they are arrested by the police after causing much panic, mischief, and chaos. They are rescued by Julia Malefète, a museum employee who closely resembles Princess Rosalind. She thinks that Thibault is her distant French cousin who drowned while yachting a couple of years ago. However, Thibault soon finds out that Julia is descended from his family and realizes he must return to the 12th century to correct the past.

Julia introduces them to the modern American style of life where norms from medieval times no longer apply. Before they return to his time, Thibault decides to protect Julia from her money-hungry fiance, Hunter. Meanwhile, Andre falls for a gardener, Angelique who presents him with the world of equal rights for all people.

The wizard realizes his mistake and decides to time travel into the future to help Thibault. After he finds him, he successfully prepares a potion to return to the past. André confronts Thibault, telling him he does not want to return to the 12th century, Julia convinces Thibault that he should set him free. Hunter tries to prevent Thibault from interfering with his plans but Julia finds out his real intentions and breaks up with him. Before he leaves, Thibault tells Julia that she will meet a new and better man to marry. Then, he and the wizard drink the potion in the museum and return to the past just before the murder of Princess Rosalind. However, this time, Thibault offers the tainted wine to the Earl as a peace offering, the latter of whom, not wanting to drink it, jumps out a window to his death. Thibault and Rosalind are then happily reunited. Back in the present, Hunter finds and drinks the remainder of the potion which sends him to the 12th century where he is captured.

Julia decides to reclaim her ancestral castle, much to the firm's delight, and meets a man named Francois Le Combier, who knows a great deal about her family's history. In the last scene, André and Angelique are seen driving in a hot rod towards Las Vegas, and André wonders one thing, who would protect him from the Devil? Angelique simply replies "Hey, at least you got me, babe", to which André happily agrees.

Cast
Jean Reno as Thibault
Christina Applegate as Rosalind / Julia
Christian Clavier as Andre
Matt Ross as Hunter
Tara Reid as Angelique
Bridgette Wilson-Sampras as Amber
John Aylward as Byron
George Plimpton as Dr. Brady
Malcolm McDowell as Wizard
Alexis Loret as François

Soundtrack

Home video
The film was released on VHS and DVD on September 11, 2001.

Box office

The film opened at  12 at the North American box office making $2,272,489 USD in its opening weekend.

Reception
 

The film received generally negative reviews. Rotten Tomatoes give the film a score of 33% based on reviews from 79 critics. The site's consensus reads, "This remake of the French comedy Les Visiteurs ends up being a middling, forgettable effort -- not as good as the original."

References

External links

 
 
 
 

2001 films
2000s fantasy comedy films
2000s science fiction comedy films
American science fiction comedy films
American fantasy comedy films
American multilingual films
French multilingual films
2001 multilingual films
American remakes of French films
2000s English-language films
Films set in the 12th century
Films set in England
Films set in Chicago
Films shot in Chicago
Hollywood Pictures films
Films about time travel
Films with screenplays by John Hughes (filmmaker)
Films scored by John Powell
Films directed by Jean-Marie Poiré
English-language French films
2001 comedy films
2000s American films
Foreign films set in the United States